This is a list of books which have been featured on BBC Radio 4's Book of the Week during the year 2016.

January
 Young Orson by Patrick McGilligan, read by Jack Klaff
 The Vanishing Man by Laura Cumming, read by Siobhan Redmond
 The Outrun by Amy Liptrot, read by Tracy Wiles
 Summer Before the Dark by Volker Weidermann
 Stop the Clocks by Joan Bakewell

February
 City of Thorns by Ben Rawlence
 Benjamin Franklin in London by George Goodwin
 The Other Paris by Lucy Sante, read by Simon Russell Beale
 The Real Henry James by Henry Goodman, read by Olivia Williams

March
 Seamus Heaney's Aeneid Book VI by Seamus Heaney, read by Ian McKellen
 Quicksand by Henning Mankell, read by Tim Pigott-Smith
 But you did not come back by Marceline Loridan-Ivens
 The Onlooker by Irène Némirovsky, read by David Suchet
 This Orient Isle by Jerry Brotton, read by Derek Jacobi

April
 Beethoven for a Later Age by Edward Dusinberre, read by Tim McMullan
 At the Existentialist Cafe by Sarah Bakewell, read by Sasha Behar
 A House Full of Daughters by Juliet Nicolson, read by Juliet Stevenson

May
 The Running Hare by John Lewis-Stempel, read by Bernard Hill
 Fingers in the Sparkle Jar  by Chris Packham, ready by the author and Rachel Atkins
 Memories: From Moscow to the Black Sea  by Tracy Ann Oberman, read by Tracy Ann Oberman
 In the Bonesetter's Waiting Room  by Aarathi Prasad, read by Sudha Bhuchar

June
 Love from Boy – Roald Dahl's Letters to His Mother by Roald Dahl, read by Rory Kinnear and Donald Sturrock
 Only in Naples by Katherine Wilson, read by Fenella Woolgar
Negroland  by Margo Jefferson, read by the author
 The Gene by Siddhartha Mukherjee, read by Raj Ghatak
 White Sands by Geoff Dyer redy by Alex Jennings

July
 Evelyn Waugh: A Life Revisited by Philip Eade, read by Nickolas Grace
 Van Gogh's Ear: The True Story by Bernadette Murphy, ready by Rebecca Front
 Beatrix Potter: A Life in Nature by Linda Lear, ready by Lindsay Duncan

August
 The Age of Bowie by Paul Morley
 Flaneuse – Woman Who Walk the Cities by Lauren Elkin, read by Julianna Jennings
 Upbeat by Paul MacAlindin, read by Kenny Blyth
 Wish Lanterns by Alec Ash, read by David Seddon
 Shrinking Violets by Joe Moran, read by Nigel Planer

September
 Beryl Bainbridge – Love by All Sorts of Means by Brendan King, read by James Fleet and Samantha Bond
 The Pigeon Tunnel: Stories from My Life by John le Carré, read by the author
 Elizabeth Jane Howard: A Dangerous Innocence by Artemis Cooper, ready by Greta Scacchi
 Another Day in the Death of America by Gary Younge

October
 The Return by Hisham Matar, read by Khalid Abdalla
 The Invention of Angela Carter by Edmund Gordon, read by Emma Fielding
 A collection of essays entitled The Good Immigrant
 "Namaste" by Nikesh Shukla, read by the author
 "A Guide to Being Black" by Varaidzo, read by the author
 "Flags" by Coco Khan
 "The Ungrateful Country", by Musa Okwonga, read by the author
 Keeping On Keeping On by Alan Bennett read by the author

November
 The Apple Orchard by Pete Brown, read by the author
 Fear by Sir Ranulph Fiennes, read by the author
 Reality Is Not What It Seems by Carlo Rovelli, read by Mark Meadows

December
 Mad Enchantment by Ross King, read by Allan Corduner
 This Long Pursuit by Richard Holmes, read by Patrick Malahide
 Love of Country by Madeleine Bunting, read by Doon Mackichan
 Snow by Marcus Sedgwick, read by Jonathan Firth

References

Lists of books
Lists of radio series episodes